Jim Hrivnak (born May 28, 1968) is a Canadian former professional ice hockey goaltender. Selected by the Washington Capitals in the 1986 NHL Draft, Hrivnak played parts of four seasons with the Capitals before joining the Winnipeg Jets and later, the St. Louis Blues.

Playing career
Hrivnak played for Merrimack College from 1985 to 1989. In two consecutive seasons with Merrimack, Hrivnak was named an All-American for 1987 and 1988. He also holds Merrimack's record for most shutouts in a season and over his career. Following his graduation, Hrivnak played with the Capitals American Hockey League affiliate, the Baltimore Skipjacks, to conclude their 1988–89 season.

Hrivnak made his NHL debut on December 6, 1989, against the Pittsburgh Penguins and stopped one shot. On March 22, 1993, Hrivnak was traded from the Capitals to the Winnipeg Jets for Rick Tabaracci. On July 29, 1993, Hrivnak was traded to the St. Louis Blues in exchange for a 7th round draft pick.

While playing with the St. Louis Blues during the 1993–94 season, he set a new record for most saves by a Blues goaltender against the Boston Bruins with 46.

After spending a few seasons playing in the International Hockey League, Ice Hockey Superleague, and Germany2, Hrivnak joined Ässät in the Finnish league Liiga to compete in their 1999–2000 season. He played 34 games in two seasons with Ässät. On October 28, 2003, Hrivnak joined the Granby Prédateurs of the Quebec Senior Major Hockey League.

In 2018, Hrivnak was inducted into the Merrimack College Athletics Hall of Fame.

Career statistics

Regular season and playoffs

References

External links
 

1968 births
Living people
Ässät players
Baltimore Skipjacks players
Canadian expatriate ice hockey players in England
Canadian expatriate ice hockey players in Finland
Canadian expatriate ice hockey players in Germany
Canadian ice hockey goaltenders
Carolina Monarchs players
Hamburg Crocodiles players
Ice hockey people from Montreal
Kansas City Blades players
Kölner Haie players
Las Vegas Thunder players
Manchester Storm (1995–2002) players
Merrimack Warriors men's ice hockey players
Milwaukee Admirals (IHL) players
St. Louis Blues players
Washington Capitals draft picks
Washington Capitals players
Winnipeg Jets (1979–1996) players